Michael Walsh may refer to:

Politicians and military
 Michael Walsh (British Army officer) (1927–2015), British Army major-general
 Michael Walsh (Medal of Honor) (1858–1913), chief machinist serving in the U.S. Navy and Medal of Honor recipient
 Michael F. Walsh (1894–1956), Secretary of State of New York 1939–1943
 Michael James Walsh (1858–1933), Canadian politician
 Michael Walsh (New York politician) (1810–1859), U.S. Representative from New York
 Michael P. Walsh (1838–1919), Wisconsin labor activist and politician

Sportspeople

Footballers
 Mickey Walsh (born 1954), football striker
 Michael Walsh (footballer, born 1977), English football (soccer) player
 Michael Walsh (footballer, born 1986), English football (soccer) player for Chester City
 Michael Walsh (footballer, born 1977), English football (soccer) player

Hurlers
 Michael Walsh (Kilkenny hurler) (born 1961), goalkeeper for Kilkenny
 Michael Walsh (Waterford hurler) (born 1983), Waterford player
 Michael Walsh (London hurler) (born 1986), Irish hurler
 Michael Walsh (Young Irelands hurler) ( 2015), Irish hurler for Kilkenny

Other sports
 Michael G. Walsh (1906–1993), Irish steeplechase trainer

Other people
 M. Emmet Walsh (born 1935), American actor
 "Michael Walsh", pen name of Michael McLaughlin (born 1940), British far-right activist 
 Michael Walsh (engineer) (born 1943), American vehicle emissions engineer
 Michael Walsh (film critic) (born 1945), Canadian film critic and print journalist
 Michael Walsh (author) (born 1949), American music critic, author and screenwriter
 Michael Walsh (publisher) ( since 1960s), of Old Earth Books
 Michael J. Walsh ( since 2003), American designer and creative director

See also
 Mike Walsh (disambiguation)
 Michael Welsh (disambiguation)